Great Lakes National Cemetery is a United States National Cemetery located in Holly, Oakland County, Michigan. It was established in 2005, and is one of two national cemeteries in Michigan (the other being Fort Custer). Administered by the United States Department of Veterans Affairs, the cemetery covers 544 acres and, as of 2014, had over 23,000 interments.

History 
The land of the cemetery was once owned by the industrialist and Spanish–American War veteran, Bryson Dexter Horton, founder of Square D electronics. The first interment took place on October 17, 2005.

Notable interments 
 Allan Barnes (1949–2016), jazz musician
 Lynn Chandnois (1923–2011), professional football player and World War II veteran
 Mack Rice (1933–2016), songwriter and singer

References

External links 
 Great Lakes National Cemetery
 

United States national cemeteries
Cemeteries in Michigan